Shahi is a town and a nagar panchayat in Bareilly district in the Indian state of Uttar Pradesh.Shahi is the one of most old British town areas First Chairman of Town Shahi is Haji Nadir Shah khan in 1868 after him his Son Khan bahadur Mohammed Raza Khan is Chairman and M.L.A of bareilly he is also Chairman of district Board Bareilly, after Mohammed Raza Khan death his son Hamid Raza Khan is also became Chairman and M.L.A of Bhojipura Constituency he is a Famous politician after his death in 1989 Son of Hamid Raza Khan, Shahid Raza khan Became Chairman of Town Area Shahi for Almost 50 years

History
Shahi is an old town,Shahi is named by Shershah Suri, serving as a stronghold of the Katehria Rajputs before coming under Islamic rule. It was the seat of a pargana at least from the time of Akbar, and probably earlier. It is mentioned in the Ain-i-Akbarias a pargana in the sarkar of Sambhal, producing a revenue of 900,496 dams for the imperial treasury and a force of 200 infantry and 20 cavalry to the Mughal army. Parts of the pargana were later transferred to Karor. Shahi also formed the seat of a tehsil from 1813 until 1824 or 1825, when it was merged with Ajaon with the headquarters at Dunka. Then in 1863 it was put under Mirganj tehsil.

Around the turn of the 20th century, Shahi was described as a small market town, with markets held twice a week Tuesday & Saturday and a small fair held every Thursday. There was a police station, a post office, a cattle-pound, a middle school, a girls' school, and a canal inspection office. The population in 1901 was 3,556, with 1,991 being Hindu, 1,516, being Muslim, and 49 belonging to other religious groups.

Geography
It has an average elevation of 171 metres (561 feet). The town is on the banks of the Gaula River.

Demographics
As of the 2001 Census of India, Shahi had a population of 13,898. Males constitute 53% of the population and females 47%. Shahi has an average literacy rate of 26%, lower than the national average of 59.5%: male literacy is 32%, and female literacy is 19%. In Shahi, 22% of the population is under six years of age.

References

Cities and towns in Bareilly district